Oligodon bitorquatus is a species of snake of the family Colubridae.

Geographic range
The snake is found in Indonesia.

References 

Reptiles described in 1827
Reptiles of Indonesia
Colubrids
bitorquatus